Old Oakland is a historic district in downtown Oakland, California.  The area is located on the northwest side of Broadway, between the City Center complex and the Jack London Square district, and across Broadway from Chinatown.

The Old Oakland district was the "original" downtown Oakland during the 1860s after Central Pacific Railroad constructed a terminus on 7th Street.  By the 1870s, elegant brick Victorian hotels were being built in the blocks surrounding the railroad station to accommodate travelers.  The ground floor of the hotels were designed as series of narrow shops so that pedestrians would pass by many of them just walking down the block.  The architectural styles of the time featured tall, cast-iron columns and large plate-glass windows.

The downtown began its decline after the 1906 San Francisco earthquake, when the shopping district began moving to the blocks north of 14th.

In the 1970s and 1980s developers carefully rehabilitated and restored a block along 9th Street between Washington Street and Broadway, known as "Victorian Row".  Notable structures on Victorian Row include the 1878 Nicholl Block building.

In its early days, the Oakland Tribune rented a small office on 9th Street.  A sign for the Tribune office can still be seen hanging outside the building today (2007).  A farmer's market is also held every Friday on the same stretch of 9th Street.

As of 2008, the neighborhood continues to gentrify as a 'downtown lifestyle' district, more bistros and boutiques have cropped-up, as more market-rate condominiums have been constructed nearby, and as transit-oriented development retail and housing become more and more in demand. Swan's Market for example is an indoor-outdoor market and popular gather place for lunch.

See also

Oakland Chinatown
Jack London Square
Lakeside Apartments District
Oakland City Center
Oaksterdam
Uptown Oakland

References

External links
 Old Oakland Historic District Business Association
  SOBU - Sustainable Furniture & Design

Neighborhoods in Oakland, California
Historic districts in California